The Cuban underwater formation is a site thought by some to be a submerged granite structural complex off the coast of the Guanahacabibes Peninsula in the Pinar del Río Province of Cuba.

Overview
The discovery was reported by Pauline Zalitzki, a marine engineer, and her husband Paul Weinzweig, owners of a Canadian company called Advanced Digital Communications, working on an exploration and survey mission in conjunction with the Cuban government. The team returned to the site a second time with an underwater remotely operated vehicle that filmed sonar images interpreted as various pyramids and circular structures made out of massive, smooth blocks of stone that resembled hewn granite. Zalitzki said "It's a really wonderful structure which really looks like it could have been a large urban centre. However, it would be totally irresponsible to say what it was before we have evidence."

After studying the images, National Geographic senior editor John Echave said: "They are interesting anomalies, but that's as much as anyone can say right now, but I'm no expert on sonar and until we are able to actually go down there and see, it will be difficult to characterize them." Professor of oceanography Robert Ballard was quoted as saying: "That's too deep. I'd be surprised if it was human. You have to ask yourself: how did it get there? I've looked at a lot of sonar images in my life, and it can be sort of like looking at an ink blot -- people can sometimes see what they want to see. I'll just wait for a bit more data."

Marine geologist Manuel Iturralde called for more samples before drawing conclusions about the site, saying the results so far were very unusual. He estimated that it would have taken 50,000 years for such structures to have sunken to the depth at which they were said to be found and stated that none of the known cultures living that long ago had the ability to build such structures. A specialist in underwater archaeology at Florida State University added: "It would be cool if they were right, but it would be real advanced for anything we would see in the New World for that time frame. The structures are out of time and out of place."

See also
Adam's Bridge
Baltic Sea anomaly
Bimini Road
Unidentified submerged object
Yonaguni Monument

References

Geography of Pinar del Río Province
Landforms of Cuba
Earth mysteries
Pseudoarchaeology